Brian Matthew Rickman (born February 17, 1977) is an American lawyer and judge from Georgia. He is the Chief Judge of the Georgia Court of Appeals.

Education

Rickman was born in Madison County, Georgia. He earned his Bachelor of Arts from Piedmont College and received his Juris Doctor from the University of Georgia School of Law.

Legal career

He began his legal career as an Assistant District Attorney for the Alcovy Judicial and Mountain Judicial Circuits of Georgia. From 2004 to 2008, he was a partner with the law firm Stockton & Rickman, LLC.

Rickman was appointed as district attorney for the Mountain Judicial Circuit by Governor Sonny Perdue from January 2, 2008 until his appointment. He previously served as a district attorney's office investigator. In May 2015, Governor Deal appointed him to serve on the Georgia Commission on Medical Cannabis.

Appointment to Georgia Court of Appeals

In early October 2015 Rickman was one of 11 individuals under consideration for appointment to the court of appeals. On October 29, 2015 Governor Nathan Deal announced the appointment of Rickman to the Georgia Court of Appeals, for a term beginning January 1, 2016. He was sworn into office by Governor Deal on December 29, 2015. On June 24, 2021, he was sworn in as Chief Judge for a term commencing July 1, 2021.

Personal

He and his wife, Maggie, have two children and reside in Tiger, Georgia.

References

External links
Official Biography on Georgia Judicial Branch website

1977 births
Living people
District attorneys in Georgia (U.S. state)
Georgia (U.S. state) lawyers
Georgia Court of Appeals judges
People from Madison County, Georgia
Piedmont University alumni
University of Georgia School of Law alumni
20th-century American lawyers
21st-century American judges